Leila Tuulikki Haaparanta (née Taiminen, born 20 October 1954) is a Finnish philosopher who works in analytic philosophy and the philosophy of logic. She is retired from the University of Tampere as a professor emerita.

Education and career
Haaparanta was born on 20 October 1954 in Kalvola. She studied philosophy at the University of Helsinki, earning a bachelor's degree in 1976, a master's degree in 1978, a licenciate in 1979, and a Ph.D. in 1985; her dissertation was Frege's Doctrine of Being.

She taught at the University of Helsinki from 1977 to 1994, becoming an assistant in 1987, and held an affiliation as a researcher at the Academy of Finland from 1985 to 1997. She became a professor at the University of Tampere in 1998, and retired as professor emerita in 2018.

Books
Haaparanta is the editor of:
Frege Synthesized: Essays on the Philosophical and Foundational Work of Gottlob Frege (with Jaakko Hintikka, D. Reidel Publishing, 1986)
Mind, Meaning and Mathematics: Essays on the Philosophical Views of Husserl and Frege (Synthese Library 237, Springer, 1994)
Analytic Philosophy in Finland (with Ilkka Niiniluoto, Rodopi, 2003)
The Development of Modern Logic (Oxford University Press, 2009)
Categories of Being: Essays on Metaphysics and Logic (with Heikki J. Koskinen, Oxford University Press, 2012)

Recognition
Haaparanta was elected to the Finnish Academy of Science and Letters in 2002, and to the Academia Europaea in 2011.

A festschrift in her honor, Filosofisia tutkielmia: Philosophical Studies in honorem Leila Haaparanta, was edited by Luoma Kaisa, Oesch Erna, and Vilkko Risto, and published in 2004.

References

1954 births
Living people
Finnish philosophers
Finnish women philosophers
University of Helsinki alumni
Academic staff of the University of Helsinki
Academic staff of the University of Tampere
Members of Academia Europaea